The 1793 Parliament of Negrete was a diplomatic meeting between Mapuches and Spanish authorities held in Negrete. The parliament was held from March 4 to March 6 of 1793. 161 caciques and 2380 Mapuche warriors attended the meeting.

References

Negrete 1793
1793 in the Captaincy General of Chile
History of Biobío Region